The Sheikh Jaber Al-Ahmad Al-Sabah Causeway is a causeway in Kuwait with an estimated construction value of approximately US$3 billion Under China's Belt and Road Initiative, the causeway is part of the first phase of the Silk City project. The causeway spans the Bay of Kuwait in two directions and comprises two projects: Main Link, which connects Kuwait City with northern Kuwait (including Subiya, Bubiyan Island, and Al Mutlaa City); and Doha Link, which connects Kuwait City with Doha. It crosses two artificial islands (Bay Island North and Bay Island South) which were constructed for entertainment and tourism purposes. The causeway project is part of Kuwait Vision 2035.

The causeway is named after the late Sheikh Jaber Al-Sabah to commemorate his contribution to the development of Kuwait. It was one of the largest and most challenging transport infrastructure projects in Kuwait, as well as the entire Middle East region. The Main Link is the 4th longest road bridge in the world at 36.14 km. The overall causeway consists of two bridges. Both bridges have a combined length of 48.5 kilometers.

History 

Under China's Belt and Road Initiative, the causeway is part of the first phase of the Silk City project. Construction began on November 3, 2013 at a cost of approximately US$3 billion, the Sheikh Jaber Al-Ahmad Al-Sabah Causeway belongs to a series of projects being pursued by Kuwait to develop and diversify its economy and reduce its reliance on oil and gas. This push to diversify is similar to those being pursued by Saudi Arabia and other countries in the region. The project is part of Kuwait Vision 2035, and is named after the 13th Emir of Kuwait to commemorate his leadership.

The overall aim of the project is to reduce the travel distance between Kuwait City and Silk City from 104 km to 36 km, which will cut the journey time from 90 minutes at present to less than 30 minutes. Building the causeway will provide a new strategic highway route that will help planned development work located to the north of Kuwait City, as it will connect Shuwaikh Port with the Subiya New Town Development (Silk City). And it will help to integrate the northern areas of the country with the more densely populated central and southern regions, while also helping lower traffic congestion in the surrounding roads.

Design 
The bridge's structural design is based on designs from the American Association of State Highways and Transportation Officials. The prominent feature of the Main Link is the iconic pylon for the cable-stayed bridge that is inspired by the conventional sailboat, a traditional and historic theme of Kuwait. The pylon stands at approximately 151 meters, which is about the same height as that of the prominent Kuwait Towers.

Originally, the causeway project was conceived as one project (Main Link and Doha Link), but, in order to expedite the completion of the works, the project was tendered in two contracts: Main Link (36.14 km) and Doha link (12.4 km). The causeway project witnessed the participation and collaboration of major engineering, design, and contracting firms from around the world, including the US, France, Hong Kong, South Korea, Germany, Italy, and Austria; of course in addition to the Dar offices in Beirut and Cairo. Major companies such as Hyundai Engineering and Construction, G.S. Engineering & Construction, Systra, AECOM, T.Y. Lin International, Tony Gee & Partners, Trevi, and Fugro, as well as suppliers like Hyundai Steel, Jenoptik, Swarco, and Solari also played major parts.

An essential aspect of the bridge, which was tackled at the commencement of the work, was the environmental risks involved, what with the bridge passing through existing natural habitats. From the outset of construction, there was a strong effort to minimise any interference or damage to the flora/ fauna and the sea environment as a whole, whether temporarily during construction or permanently. Green Tiger Shrimps that are famous residents of the Kuwait Bay were protected with the establishment of new vegetation habitats where artificial reefs were installed away from the bridge construction zones. This effort was very successful as the involved parties were able to see the new shrimp habitats taking place away from the bridge location, and shrimps were reproduced in abundant capacities.

See also
 Madinat al-Hareer
 Al Mutlaa City
 Mubarak Al Kabeer Port
 Kuwait National Cultural District

References

Belt and Road Initiative
Transport buildings and structures in Kuwait
2019 establishments in Kuwait
Bridges completed in 2019
Chinese investment abroad